The 1990 Men's Hockey Champions Trophy ' was the 12th edition of the Hockey Champions Trophy, an international men's field hockey tournament organized by the FIH. It took place from 17 to 25 November 1990 in Melbourne, Australia.

The hosts, Australia won a record-extending fifth title and their second title in a row by finishing first in the round-robin tournament.

Tournament

Pool

Results

Statistics

Winners

Final standings

Winning Squad

External links
FIH page

Men's Champions Trophy
Champions Trophy
International field hockey competitions hosted by Australia
Champions Trophy (field hockey)
November 1990 sports events in Australia
1990s in Melbourne
Sports competitions in Melbourne